Dual specificity protein phosphatase 4 is an enzyme that in humans is encoded by the DUSP4 gene.

Function 

The protein encoded by this gene is a member of the dual specificity protein phosphatase subfamily. These phosphatases inactivate their target kinases by dephosphorylating both the phosphoserine/threonine and phosphotyrosine residues. They negatively regulate members of the mitogen-activated protein (MAP) kinase superfamily (MAPK/ERK, SAPK/JNK, p38), which are associated with cellular proliferation and differentiation. Different members of the family of dual specificity phosphatases show distinct substrate specificities for various MAP kinases, different tissue distribution and subcellular localization, and different modes of inducibility of their expression by extracellular stimuli. This gene product inactivates ERK1, ERK2 and JNK, is expressed in a variety of tissues, and is localized in the nucleus. Two alternatively spliced transcript variants, encoding distinct isoforms, have been observed for this gene. In addition, multiple polyadenylation sites have been reported.

In melanocytic cells DUSP4 gene expression may be regulated by MITF.

References

Further reading

External links 
 

EC 3.1.3